Arses is a genus of monarch flycatchers in the family Monarchidae. The genus is restricted to forest and second growth on the island of New Guinea, a few surrounding islands and northern Queensland, Australia. The genus is separated by their frilled necks, fleshy blue eye wattles and delicate pendent nests. They also have a distinctive foraging technique, hopping up tree trunks in a spiral fashion.

Taxonomy
The genus Arses was introduced by the French naturalist René Lesson in 1831. The type species was subsequently designated as the frilled monarch (Arses telescopthalmus) by English zoologist George Robert Gray in 1840. The genus name is from the Persian king Arses who ruled from 338 until 336 BC.

The genus contains four species:

Ochre-collared monarch (Arses insularis)
Frilled monarch (Arses telescopthalmus)
Frill-necked monarch (Arses lorealis)
Pied monarch (Arses kaupi)

References

  Clement, P (2006) Family Monarchidae (Monarch-flycatchers); in del Hoyo J, Elliott A & Christie D eds. Handbook of the Birds of the World. Vol 11 Old World Flycatchers to Old World Warblers. Lynx Edicions, Barecelona. 

 
Bird genera
Taxa named by René Lesson